Petr Zábojník (born 3 October 1980 in Liberec) is a Czech footballer. He formerly played for FK Jablonec 97 for 6 seasons.

Zábojník played for Jablonec as the club was eliminated in the qualifying rounds of the 2007–08 UEFA Cup and 2010–11 UEFA Europa League.

References

External links
 Player profile 

1980 births
Living people
Czech footballers
Czech First League players
FC Slovan Liberec players
SK Slavia Prague players
FK Jablonec players
FK Baník Most players
Association football defenders
Sportspeople from Liberec